Laidley railway station is located on the Main line in Queensland, Australia. It serves the town of Laidley. The station has two side platforms, opening in 1866.

Services
Laidley is served by Queensland Rail Travel's twice weekly Westlander service travelling between Brisbane and Charleville.

Transport links
Laidley Bus Services operates one route via Laidley station:
 539: Heildon to Rosewood station service

References

External links
 
 Laidley station Queensland's Railways on the Internet

Laidley, Queensland
Railway stations in Australia opened in 1866
Railway stations in Lockyer Valley Region
Main Line railway, Queensland